Per Carlqvist (born 25 July 1938 in Stockholm, Sweden) is a Swedish plasma physicist with an interest in astrophysical applications. In 1963, he received the degree of civilingenjör from the Royal Institute of Technology, Stockholm, in 1970 the Tekn. lic., and in 1980 the Tekn. D.

He is currently affiliated with the Royal Institute of Technology, Stockholm, at the School of Electrical Engineering in the department of Space & Plasma Physics.

He is the author of several papers on astrophysical plasmas, from the formation of stars, double layers, the Bennett Pinch, to interstellar helical filaments.

The Carlqvist Relation
Carlqvist lends his name to the "Carlqvist Relation", a formula used in plasma physics to describe how an electrically conducting plasma filament is compressed by magnetic forces to form a "plasma pinch". Carlqvist noted that by using his relation, and a derivative, it is possible to describe the Bennett pinch, the Jeans criterion (for gravitational instability, in one and two dimensions), force-free magnetic fields, gravitationally balanced magnetic pressures, and continuous transitions between these states.

Notes

External links
Articles on NASA Astrophysics Data System (ADS) by Per Carlqvist
All articles | With Abstracts | With Full text

1938 births
Swedish physicists
Academic staff of the KTH Royal Institute of Technology
Living people